Younes Shakeri (born 1 January 1990) is an Iranian footballer forward who currently plays for Gol Gohar Sirjan.

Career

Aboomoslem
He joined Aboomoslem in summer 2005 from the club's youth academy. He started his professional career with Aboomoslem's first team in 2008.

Fajr Sepasi
He played two seasons for Aboomoslem and moved to Fajr Sepasi in summer 2010. Shakeri played with Fajr Sepasi until 2012.

Aboomoslem
Shakeri return to Aboomoslem in 2012. He played in 25 games, scored 12 times and received 7 yellow cards. He was second top goalscorer in the 2012–13 Azadegan League.

Persepolis
He signed a three-year contract with Persepolis on 3 May 2013. He made 5 league appearances before being loaned out to Padideh.

Padideh
On November 27, 2013 he joined his home side, Padideh, with a 4-month loan deal. He scored two goals in his first game for Padideh in the Azadegan League. He netted a hat-trick in a match with Niroye Zamini. Shakeri became Padide's leading scorer and led Padideh to an Iran Pro League promotion.

On 24 May 2014, Shakeri signed a permanent deal with Padideh worth 550 million Rial. He also scored Padideh's first goal in their first season in the Iran Pro League during a 3–0 win over Naft Masjed Soleyman on 8 August 2014.

Club career statistics

Honours

Club
Padideh
Azadegan League: 2013–14

References

External links

Younes Shakeri at PersianLeague.com
Younes Shakeri at ffiri.ir
Younes Shakeri on instagram

1990 births
Living people
Fajr Sepasi players
Iranian footballers
F.C. Aboomoslem players
Persepolis F.C. players
Shahr Khodro F.C. players
People from Nishapur
Association football forwards
Persian Gulf Pro League players